Neuchâtel is a city in Switzerland.

Neuchâtel may also refer to:

Neuchatel, Kansas, a community in the United States

Neuchâtel, Switzerland
Canton of Neuchâtel, whose capital is the city
Neuchâtel (district), within the canton, contains the city
Neuchatel Junior College, a private Canadian grade 12 program in the town of Neuchatel
Neuchâtel Xamax, a football club in the city
Lake Neuchâtel, with the city on its shore
University of Neuchâtel, in the city

See also 
 Neuchâtel-Urtière a French commune in the Doubs département.
 Neufchâtel (disambiguation)
 Castelnau (disambiguation)